Qareh Qayeh or Qarah Qayah or Qarah Qayeh or Qareh Qayah or Qareh Qiyeh, also rendered as Qaraqiah may refer to:
 Qarah Qayah, Ardabil
 Qarah Qayah, Ahar, East Azerbaijan Province
 Qarah Qayah, Kaleybar, East Azerbaijan Province
 Qareh Qayeh, Meyaneh, East Azerbaijan Province
 Qarah Qayah, Sarab, East Azerbaijan Province
 Qareh Qayeh, Varzaqan, Varzaqan County, East Azerbaijan
 Qareh Qayah, Kharvana, Varzaqan County, East Azerbaijan Province
 Qarah Qayah, Fars
 Qareh Qayeh, Hamadan
 Qarah Qayeh, Kurdistan
 Qarah Qayeh, Shahin Dezh, West Azerbaijan Province
 Qarah Qayah, Takab, West Azerbaijan Province
 Qarah Qayeh, Zanjan